Julie Elizabeth Carnes (born October 31, 1950) is a senior United States circuit judge of the United States Court of Appeals for the Eleventh Circuit.

Early life and education 

Born in Atlanta, Georgia, Carnes is the daughter of Georgia state court judge Charles Carnes. She received a Bachelor of Arts degree from the University of Georgia in 1972 and a Juris Doctor from the University of Georgia School of Law in 1975. She was a law clerk to Judge Lewis R. Morgan of the United States Court of Appeals for the Fifth Circuit from 1975 to 1977.

Professional career 

Carnes was an Assistant United States Attorney in the U.S. Attorney's Office for the Northern District of Georgia, from 1978 to 1990 and was Appellate Chief of the Criminal Division from 1987 to 1989. She was a member of the U.S. Attorney General's Advisory Committee on Sentencing Guidelines from 1988 to 1990 and was a Special Counsel to the U.S. Sentencing Commission in 1989 and a Commissioner on the U.S. Sentencing Commission from 1990 to 1996.

Federal judicial service

Service on the District Court for the Northern District of Georgia
On August 1, 1991, Carnes was nominated by President George H. W. Bush to a seat on the United States District Court for the Northern District of Georgia vacated by Robert H. Hall. She was confirmed by the United States Senate on February 6, 1992 and received her commission on February 10, 1992. From 2009 to 2014 she served as chief judge. Her service as a district court judge was terminated on July 31, 2014 when she was elevated to the United States Court of Appeals for the Eleventh Circuit.

Service on the Eleventh Circuit Court of Appeals
On December 19, 2013, President Barack Obama nominated Judge Carnes to a vacant seat on the United States Court of Appeals for the Eleventh Circuit due to James Larry Edmondson assuming senior status She received a hearing before the full panel of the United States Senate Judiciary Committee on May 13, 2014. On June 19, 2014 her nomination was reported out of committee by a voice vote. On July 16, 2014, Senate Majority Leader Harry Reid filed a motion to invoke cloture on Carnes' nomination. On July 17, 2014 the motion to invoke cloture was agreed to by a 68–23 vote. On July 21, 2014 the United States Senate voted 94–0 to elevate Carnes to the Eleventh Circuit. She received her judicial commission on July 31, 2014. She assumed senior status on June 18, 2018.

Carnes is unrelated to Edward Earl Carnes, with whom she serves on the Eleventh Circuit.

JonBenét Ramsey 

Julie Carnes was the judge in a lawsuit related to the homicide of JonBenét Ramsey.  An early suspect in JonBenét's murder, Chris Wolf, sued JonBenét's parents, John and Patsy Ramsey, for slander.  In their book, The Death of Innocence, John and Patsy Ramsey had mentioned a few suspects in their daughter's death, including Chris Wolf.  Wolf sued the Ramseys for defamation, using gadfly attorney Darnay Hoffman to represent him.  In his suit, Wolf contended that the Ramseys themselves were responsible for JonBenét's death, and were therefore guilty of slander by portraying him as a suspect.

In the view of Judge Carnes, the case hinged largely on the question of whether JonBenét Ramsey's death was an inside job, as Wolf claimed, or the work of an intruder, as maintained by JonBenét's parents.

In a decisive ruling, Judge Carnes concluded that "abundant evidence" showed that the murder was committed by an intruder, and that the Ramseys were innocent of any involvement.  Carnes dismissed Wolf's lawsuit in summary judgment.

Notes

References
 

Living people
1950 births
20th-century American judges
21st-century American judges
Assistant United States Attorneys
Georgia (U.S. state) lawyers
Killing of JonBenét Ramsey
Judges of the United States Court of Appeals for the Eleventh Circuit
Judges of the United States District Court for the Northern District of Georgia
Members of the United States Sentencing Commission
United States court of appeals judges appointed by Barack Obama
United States district court judges appointed by George H. W. Bush
University of Georgia School of Law alumni
20th-century American women judges
21st-century American women judges